The Kőszegi  was a noble family in the Kingdom of Hungary and the Kingdom of Croatia in the 13–14th centuries. The ancestor of the family, Henry the Great descended from the gens ("clan") Héder. Henry's paternal great-grandfather was the clan's co-founder Wolfer.

Notable members

 Henry I the Great (fl. 1237–1274), Palatine of Hungary
 Nicholas I (fl. 1266–1299), Palatine of Hungary
 Nicholas II (fl. 1314–1332), Master of the horse, ancestor of the Rohonci family
 John, ancestor of the Béri family
 Ivan (fl. 1266–1308), Palatine of Hungary
 Gregory (fl. 1287–1297), Master of the stewards for the Prince
 Nicholas III (fl. 1308–1313), Master of the treasury
 Andrew (fl. 1311–1324), ispán of Vas County; last member who bore the Kőszegi name
 a daughter, married Dominic N
 John the "Wolf" (fl. 1325–1382), ancestor of the Bernstein family
 (?) Nicholas (illegitimate; fl. 1308–1336), Bishop of Győr
 Peter I (fl. 1275–1289), Bishop of Veszprém
 Henry II (fl. 1278–1310), Ban of Slavonia; married daughter of Mojs II
 John (fl. 1310–1327), Master of the horse, ancestor of the Tamási family
 Peter II (fl. 1310–1353), ispán of Bodrog County, ancestor of the Herceg de Szekcső family
 a daughter (fl. 1300), married Turcho Morosini
 a daughter, married Demetrius Csák

References

Sources